S. E. Saunders Ltd, was a British marine and aero-engineering company based at East Cowes, Isle of Wight in the early 20th century.

History
The firm was established in 1908 to continue the use of the lightweight Consuta material previously developed by Samuel Edgar Saunders.

Having developed Consuta at the family Springfield Works at Goring on the river Thames, Sam Saunders recognised a big future for the material and formed the “Saunders’ Patent Launch Building Syndicate”. As the River Thames was only suitable for small launches, the Syndicate opened a works at East Cowes, on the Isle of Wight in 1901 to developed larger craft.

Five years later the syndicate expired; Sam Saunder had found the structure of the partnership restrictive and so decided to seek an alternative arrangement. In 1908, S. E. Saunders Ltd was established, the Wolseley Tool and Motor Car Company held a small interest.

Initially S. E. Saunders Ltd concentrated on building powerboats, gunboats etc. however with the dawn of the aviation era, Sam saw that the strong, light nature of Consuta was ideal for aircraft.

Entry into the aviation products
Initially the company just built parts for other aviation concerns, such as: 
 two gondolas for the engines of the first naval airship, HMA No. 1 (also known as Mayfly), then being constructed at Barrow-in-Furness.
 the hull for Tommy Sopwith's Bat Boat
 the monocoque fuselage for White and Thompson company's 1914 tractor biplane, the White and Thompson No. 3.

Marine craft
They continued designing and building marine craft, including powerboats:
 Maple Leaf IV, a multi-step hydroplane which regained the Harmsworth Cup from America in 1912 and defended it successfully in the following year. 
and
 Estelle I and Estelle II, both single-step hydroplanes, were built in 1928 to designs of F. P. Hyde-Beadle and constructed for the wealthy yachtswoman "Joe" Carstairs. Estelle II was raced in the 1928 Harmsworth Trophy but capsized.

RNLI lifeboats
Saunders produced lifeboats for the Royal National Lifeboat Institution (RNLI), including:
 1916 - Liverpool-class 'Pulling and Sailing' types, RNLB Mary Stanford (ON 661), described as being "38 feet long and 10 feet 9 inch wide, fitted to 14 oars double-banked, and fitted with two water ballast tanks and two drop-keels." She was stationed at Rye harbour and was wrecked there in 1928.
 1916 - Liverpool-class 'Pulling and Sailing' types, The Baltic (ON 198). She was stationed at Wells-next-the-Sea Lifeboat Station
 1921 - Norfolk and Suffolk-class lifeboat, John and Mary Meiklam Of Gladswood renamed Agnes Cross (1921–1952) (ON663).
 1926 - Barnett-class 60ft lifeboat, Emma Constance (ON693)
 1929 - Barnett-class 60ft lifeboat, Princess Mary (ON715)

Later aviation

Non-Saunders designs
S. E. Saunders built a number of aircraft to the design of other organisations:

S. E. Saunders designs

Other products

In 1923 the company exhibited a dodecagonal (12-sided) prefabricated bungalow made from Consuta at the Daily Mail Ideal Home Exhibition. At least two were sold, one stood for many years on the outskirts of Newport, Isle of Wight, the other was assembled at South Milton, Devon and is Grade II listed.

Formation of Saunders-Roe
Towards the end of the 1920's the company needed additional funding for expansion and in 1929, after Alliott Verdon Roe and John Lord took a controlling interest in the company, it was re-established as Saunders-Roe.

References

Bibliography

From River to Sea: the Marine Heritage of Sam Saunders by Raymond L. Wheeler ISBN 1873295057
From Sea to Air: The Heritage of Sam Saunders by A. E. Tagg & R. L. Wheeler, ISBN 0950973939

External links
 Grace's Guide To British Industrial History
 A Short History of Saunders-Roe

Defunct shipbuilding companies of England
Companies based on the Isle of Wight
Defunct aircraft manufacturers of the United Kingdom